Tebbetts may refer to:

Tebbetts (surname)
Tebbetts, Missouri